The Columbus City Hall was added to the National Register of Historic Places in 1979.

It was designed by architect Truman Dudley Allen.

History
In addition to the offices of the city government, when the building opened in 1892, it also housed the police department, the fire department, the jail and the city library. A public auditorium is located on in the building. It has hosted traveling theater troupes, class plays, graduation ceremonies and served as a movie theater until 1917 when a separate theater opened in the city.

References

City and town halls on the National Register of Historic Places in Wisconsin
City halls in Wisconsin
Public libraries in Wisconsin
Cinemas and movie theaters in Wisconsin
Former cinemas in the United States
Buildings and structures in Columbia County, Wisconsin
Victorian architecture in Wisconsin
Government buildings completed in 1892
Columbus, Wisconsin
National Register of Historic Places in Columbia County, Wisconsin
1892 establishments in Wisconsin